The 2012 United States House of Representatives elections in Maine was held on Tuesday, November 6, 2012 to elect the two U.S. representatives from the state of Maine, one from each of the state's two congressional districts. The elections coincided with the elections of other federal and state offices, including a quadrennial presidential election and an election to the U.S. Senate. Democrats would not win both of Maine's congressional districts again until 2018.

Overview

Redistricting

Unlike most states, which will pass or have passed redistricting laws to redraw the boundaries of their congressional districts based on the 2010 United States census in advance of the 2012 elections, Maine law requires that redistricting be done in 2013. In March 2011, a lawsuit was filed asking a U.S. district judge to ensure redistricting is completed in time for the 2012 elections. According to the Census, the 1st district had a population of 8,669 greater than that of the 2nd district. The Maine Democratic Party, which opposes the lawsuit, was granted intervenor status, and argues that the lawsuit constitutes an attempt by the Maine Republican Party to force Representatives Chellie Pingree and Mike Michaud, both of whom are Democrats, to run in the same district. On June 9, 2011, a panel of three federal judges agreed that failing to redistrict would be unconstitutional, and that the state should redraw the boundaries of its districts immediately.

Governor Paul LePage will call a special session of the Maine Legislature on September 27 to consider a redistricting plan. On August 15, both Republicans and Democrats released redistricting proposals. The Republican plan would move Lincoln County, Knox County (including Pingree's hometown of North Haven) and Sagadahoc County from the 1st district to the 2nd, and move Oxford County and Androscoggin County from the 2nd district to the 1st, thereby making the 2nd district more favorable to Republicans. The Democratic plan, meanwhile, would not significantly change the current districts: only Vassalboro would be moved from the 1st district to the 2nd.

District 1

Democrat Chellie Pingree, who has represented Maine's 1st congressional district since 2009, was gathering signatures to run for the U.S. Senate, however she decided not to run. State senator Cynthia Dill and state representative Jon Hinck, both of whom are Democrats, had picked up petitions to run in the 1st district. However after Pingree stepped out of the Senate race, Dill and Hinck returned campaigning for U.S. Senate

Democratic primary

Candidates

Nominee
Chellie Pingree, incumbent U.S. Representative

Withdrawn
Cynthia Dill, state senator
Jon Hinck, state representative

Primary results

Republican primary

Candidates

Nominee
 Jon Courtney, State Senate majority leader

Eliminated in primary
 Patrick Calder, merchant marine

Declined
 Markham Gartley, former Secretary of State of Maine
 Shawn Moody, independent candidate for Governor in 2010
 Richard Snow, businessman

Primary results

Independents

Declined
Shawn Moody, independent candidate for Governor in 2010

General election

Polling

Results

District 2

Democrat Mike Michaud, who has represented Maine's 2nd congressional district since 2003, will not run for the U.S. Senate, and is running for a sixth term in the United States House of Representatives.  David Costa, a concierge at the Portland Harbor Hotel; Wellington Lyons, a lawyer; and David Lemoine, a former state treasurer, had taken out papers to seek the Democratic nomination to succeed Michaud had he run for Senate.  Emily Cain, the minority leader of the Maine House of Representatives, had also planned to seek the Democratic nomination in the 2nd district if Michaud decided to run for the Senate seat.

Democratic primary

Candidates

Nominee
Mike Michaud, incumbent U.S. Representative

Declined
Emily Cain, minority leader of the Maine House of Representatives
David Costa, concierge at the Portland Harbor Hotel
David Lemoine, former State Treasurer
Wellington Lyons, lawyer

Results

Republican primary

Candidates

Nominee
 Kevin Raye, Maine Senate president

Eliminated in primary
 Blaine Richardson, retired naval veteran

Declined
 Jason Levesque, businessman and nominee for this seat in 2010

Primary results

General election

Endorsements

Polling

Predictions

Results

References

External links
Elections from the Maine Secretary of State
United States House of Representatives elections in Maine, 2012 at Ballotpedia
Maine U.S. House at OurCampaigns.com
Campaign contributions for U.S. Congressional races in Maine at OpenSecrets
Outside spending at the Sunlight Foundation

United States House of Representatives
Maine
2012